Polski Świętów (before 1918 Polnisch Wette) is a village in the administrative district of Gmina Głuchołazy, within Nysa County, Opole Voivodeship, in south-western Poland, close to the Czech border.

The village has a population of 420.

References

Villages in Nysa County